Dorset County Cricket Club is one of twenty National county clubs within the domestic cricket structure of England and Wales. It represents the historic county of Dorset.

The team is currently a member of the National Counties Cricket Association Championship Western Division 1 and plays in the National Counties Cricket Association Knockout Trophy. Dorset played List A matches occasionally from 1968 until 2004 but is not classified as a List A team per se.

The club is currently without a permanent ground so it uses several club grounds inside the historic county boundaries, where they play their home matches.

Honours
 Minor Counties Championship (2) - 2000, 2010
 MCCA Knockout Trophy (1) - 1988
 Gillette/NatWest/C&G (0) -

Earliest cricket
An advertisement in the Sherborne Mercury dated Tuesday 9 May 1738 is the earliest reference for cricket in Dorset.  Twelve Dorchester men at Ridgway Races challenged twelve men from elsewhere to play them at cricket for the prize of twelve pairs of gloves valued at a shilling a pair.

Origin of club
According to Wisden there was county organisation in existence in either 1862 or 1871.  The present Dorset CCC was founded on 5 February 1896 and first entered the Minor Counties Championship in 1902.

Club history
Dorset has won the Minor Counties Championship twice, in 2000 and 2010.

Dorset has won the MCCA Knockout Trophy once since its inception in 1983. It won in 1988.

Notable players
See List of Dorset CCC players and :Category:Dorset cricketers
The following Dorset cricketers have also had notable careers at first-class level:
 Jimmy Adams
 William Andrew
 Peter Badham 
 John Baker 
 Tom Barber
 Patrick Barrow
 Leslie Bean 
 Rayner Blitz
 Bertie Bolton 
 Thomas Bowley 
 Derek Bridge
 Charles Brutton
 Paul Carey 
 Box Case 
 Edgar Chester-Master 
 John Claughton
 Alan Coleman 
 Robert Coombs 
 Geoff Courtenay
 Nigel Cowley
 Len Creese 
 Scott Currie
 Ray Dovey
 Charles Fawcus 
 Rob Ferley 
 Lloyd Ferreira 
 Douglas Freeman 
 Edward Freeman 
 Paul Garlick
 Archie Gibson 
 Harold Gimblett
 John Gordon 
 James Graham-Brown
 Hubert Greenhill 
 Jon Hardy
 Percy Hardy 
 Ælfric Harrison 
 Geoffrey Hebden 
 Bob Herman 
 Andrew Hodgson 
 Philip Hope 
 William Hounsell 
 Wilf Hughes 
 William Jephson 
 Gilbert Jessop
 Charles Johnston 
 Chris Jones
 Steffan Jones
 Matthew Keech
 Andrew Kennedy
 Walter Lancashire 
 Jack Leach 
 Richard Lewis
 Jacob Lintott
 Steve Malone 
 Robert Manser 
 Dimitri Mascarenhas 
 Walter McBride
 Cuan McCarthy
 Lewis McManus
 Richard Merriman
 Jigar Naik
 Geoffrey Ogilvy 
 Felix Organ
 Owen Parkin 
 David Payne
 Vyvian Pike 
 Colin Roper
 Lee Savident
 Richard Scott
 Steven Selwood 
 Andrew Sexton
 Derek Shackleton 
 Julian Shackleton
 Roger Sillence 
 Harold Stephenson
 Reginald Swalwell 
 David Taylor 
 Malcolm Taylor 
 Max Waller
 John Watson 
 Rev Bourne Webb 
 Tom Webley
 Alan Willows
 George Woodhouse
 Larry Worrell

Grounds
The club currently plays its home matches at several venues during the season which include:

 Bashley (Rydal) CC, New Milton
 Bournemouth CC, Chapel Gate
 Wimborne CC
 North Perrott Cricket Club

It formerly played at Dean Park Cricket Ground in Bournemouth, which is historically part of neighbouring Hampshire and was once used as a home venue by Hampshire County Cricket Club and Sherborne School Cricket Ground in Sherborne.

References

General
 Rowland Bowen, Cricket: A History of its Growth and Development, Eyre & Spottiswoode, 1970
 Tony Percival, Dorset Cricketers, ACS Publications, 2017
 E W Swanton (editor), Barclays World of Cricket, Guild, 1986
 Playfair Cricket Annual – various editions
 Wisden Cricketers' Almanack – various editions

External links
 Dorset County Cricket Club website
 National Counties Cricket Association official site

 
National Counties cricket
History of Dorset
Cricket clubs established in 1896
1896 establishments in England
Cricket in Dorset